Nordenskjöld Peak is a conspicuous, partly snow-covered mountain, which rises at the head of Nordenskjöld Glacier and stands close east of Mount Roots in the Allardyce Range of South Georgia. The name derives from nearby Nordenskjöld Glacier (itself named after Swedish explorer Otto Nordenskjöld), and was given by David Ferguson, Scottish geologist who visited South Georgia in 1911–12.

Mountains and hills of South Georgia